Ding Ling (October 12, 1904 – March 4, 1986), formerly romanized as Ting Ling, was the pen name of Jiang Bingzhi, also known as Bin Zhi (彬芷 Bīn Zhǐ), one of the most celebrated 20th-century Chinese women authors. She is known for her feminist and socialist realist literature.

Ding was active in leftist literary circles connected to the Chinese Communist Party and was imprisoned by the Chinese Nationalist Party for her politics. She later became a leader in the literary community in the Communist base of Yan'an, and held high literature and culture positions in the early government of the People's Republic of China. She was awarded the Soviet Union's Stalin second prize for Literature in 1951 for her socialist-realist work The Sun Shines Over Sanggan River. After the Anti-Rightist Campaign in 1958, Ding was denounced and purged and was sent to exile in Manchuria, to be rehabilitated only in 1979. She passed away in Beijing in 1986.

Early life

Ding Ling was born as Jiang Bingzhi into a gentry family in Linli, Hunan province. Her father, Jiang Baoqian, was a scholar in the late Qing Dynasty and died when Ding Ling was 3 years old. Ding Ling's mother, Yu Manzhen, studied at the Hunan Provincial No. 1 Normal School for Girls where she was a classmate of Xiang Jingyu, an early pioneer in Chinese feminism. She later became an elementary school educator who raised her children as a single mother. Ding Ling's mother was Ding's role model, and she would later write an unfinished novel, titled Mother, describing her mother's experiences. Following her mother's example, Ding Ling became an activist at an early age.

Ding Ling had her formative education in progressive girls' schools, first in Hunan and later in Shanghai. In 1919, Ding Ling graduated from primary school and was admitted to the preparatory course at the Hunan Second Normal School for Girls in Taoyuan County, where she came in contact with the May 4th student movement. In 1920, she was transferred to Changsha Zhounan Girls High School, but the school became very conservative and Ding  dropped out after one year of study. In 1921, Ding transferred to Yueyun Middle School and was a classmate with Yang Kaihui, Mao Zedong's second wife.

In the summer of 1922, Ding's friend Wang Jianhong returned home from Shanghai and took Ding to Shanghai, where she entered the Communist Party run People's Girls' School. During this time she took up the pen name Ding Ling. In 1923, she and Wang Jianhong attended the Chinese Department of Shanghai University. In 1924, Wang and her teacher, famed Communist Party literary figure Qu Qiubai fell in love and started living together. Ding Ling went to Beijing alone in the summer to study at Peking University, but to no avail.

Through his roommate Cao Mengjun 's boyfriend Zuo Gong, Ding Ling met her future husband Hu Yepin, then editor of the supplement of the Beijing News. When Ding Ling returned to her hometown during summer vacation, Hu Yepin rushed to Hunan. Ding Ling recalled, "Our thoughts, characters, and feelings are different, but his bravery, enthusiasm, stubbornness, optimism and poverty all surprised me... The smooth sintered glass beads had gone up somewhere. So we had a deep friendship right away.” In 1925, Ding Ling and Hu Yepin lived together in Beijing, but as she said, "but we had no husband and wife relationship", because "I, Ding Ling, did not want to use love or marriage to fetter me; I am a person who wants to be free".

Literature and politics 
In December 1927, Ding Ling wrote and published her first novel "Meng Ke" in Beijing, which was published in the magazine "Fiction Monthly", describing the struggle of a young woman born in a declining bureaucratic family in Shanghai. The initial concern for women's issues was appreciated by editor-in-chief Ye Shengtao.

In February 1928, Ding Ling published "Miss Sophia's Diary" in the "Fiction Monthly". The book, in which a young woman describes her unhappiness with her life and confused romantic and sexual feelings, caused a sensation in the literary world. Miss Sophia's Diary highlights Ding Ling's close association and belief in the New Woman movement which was occurring in China during the 1920's. At this time, Ding Ling and Hu Yepin frequently traveled from Beijing to Shanghai. They lived briefly in Hangzhou from March to July of the same year, and then returned to Shanghai.

Around this time Ding Ling met the Communist Party member, writer, and activist Feng Xuefeng, who unlike Hu Yepin was active in politics. Ding Ling fell in love with Feng, and at the end of February, the three had a long talk in Hangzhou, after which Feng Xuefeng backed out and Ding Ling and Hu Yebin got married and lived in Shanghai. Ding Ling later recalled: "I had lived with Hu Yepin for two and a half years, and I'd never said that I would agree to marry them, but I also did not reject his feelings for me. He gave me many things; I did not reject them. Although the two of us had an arrangement, we could have broken it off at any time. We were not husband and wife, but other people saw us as husband and wife. When I talked about these feelings, and about reason, all I could do was lose Xuefeng.”

In the summer of 1928, Ding Ling and Hu Yepin as a couple moved from Beijing to Shanghai via Hangzhou, and lived in the Shanghai French Concession. There they founded a publishing house to publish a magazine "Red and Black" together with Shen Congwen. In early 1929, Ding Ling started editing and publishing the "Renjian (Humanity)" magazine, but both magazines ceased publication soon afterward. Ding and Hu were finally broke and lived on the rent sent by Ding Ling's mother. In the winter of 1929, Ding Ling completed the novel "Wei Hu (Protection)", which was based on the love story between Ding Ling's friend Wang Jianhong and Communist Party member Qu Qiubai.

In February 1930, Hu Yepin went to Jinan to teach at the Shandong Provincial Senior High School, and Ding Ling joined him soon after. In Jinan, Hu Yepin accepted and began to actively promote Marxism-Leninism, which attracted the attention of the Kuomintang. In May of that year, after learning that Hu Yepin was in danger of arrest, Ding and Hu two fled back to Shanghai and they joined the Communist Party-affiliated League of Left-Wing Writers. In November 1930, Ding's son with Hu Yepin born. He  was named Jiang Zulin after Ding's original surname instead of Hu's surname, and was raised by his grandmother.

On January 17, 1931, Hu Yepin was arrested by the Kuomintang government for his association with the Communists and was shot to death near the Longhua temple in Shanghai on February 7. In grief, Ding Ling sent her son who was less than 100 days old back to Hunan to be taken care of by her mother. In May, Ding Ling published her and Hu Yepin's joint collection "The Birth of a Man" to commemorate Hu Yepin's death. Afterwards, Ding participated in the establishment of the League of Left-Wing Writers publication Beidou (Great Dipper). Ding  moved in with translator Feng Da in November. In March 1932, Ding Ling joined the Communist Party of China and succeeded Qian Xingcun as the party secretary of the League of Left-Wing Writers.

Political imprisonment in Nanjing

In May 1933, together with Feng Da, Ding was arrested by the Kuomintang government and was secretly sent to Nanjing under house arrest. For a long time, the Kuomintang government denied arresting Ding Ling, and many of Ding Ling's friends thought she was dead.

In September 1933, under persuasion, Ding Ling wrote the following note: "I was arrested because of a misunderstanding, and I received preferential treatment; I did not go through any trial and punishment. After going out, I will not be active in politics. I only wish to study at home and take care of my mother..."Ding thought that the note would help her regain her freedom but to no avail. (Later, under political investigation by the Communist Party, this note be used to criticize Ding. Some critics would use the note to accuse her of "losing integrity" in 1945, and of "renegade behavior, lack of loyalty and honesty to the party" in 1956 to 1975. In 1979, the conclusion of 1975 was revoked, but the conclusion of 1956 was maintained. Only in 1984 was she fully rehabilitated.)

In April 1934, Feng Da worked as an interpreter in the Kuomintang organization, and the Kuomintang still gave Ding Ling 100 yuan per month for living expenses, so while the two were still under house arrest, they had a little more freedom. Accepting living expenses has also become an issue for Ding Ling's political scrutiny in the future. In October 1934, Ding gave birth to her daughter Jiang Zuhui with Feng Da, which also took her surname instead of Feng's.

In July 1936, arranged by Feng Xuefeng, Ding fled Nanjing on train and came to Shanghai. On the night of the Mid-Autumn Festival, she escaped from a hiding place at a friend's house in Shanghai and arrived in Xi'an in early October, after which she made her way to the Communist base of Yan'an the month after.

Early life in Yan'an 
Ding Ling became one of the most influential figures in Yan'an cultural circles, serving as director of the Chinese Literature and Arts Association and editing a newspaper literary supplement. As arguably the most famous writer who came to the Communist-controlled Yan'an area from the Kuomintang-controlled area, she initially enjoyed close relations with many top Communist leaders. At the end of 1936, Mao Zedong wrote and dedicated the poem "The Immortal from Linjiang" to her:壁上红旗飘落照，西风漫卷孤城，保安人物一时新，洞中开宴会，招待出牢人，纤笔一支谁与拟，三千毛瑟精兵，阵图开向陇山东，昨日文小姐，今日武将军.

"Gently billowing the red flag on the city wall, the West Wind envelops the lonely city. New men and women suddenly arrive, and a banquet is held in the yaodong caves to receive our released prisoner (Ding Ling). To your elegant brush, who can compare? For your brush is like three thousand crack troops wielding rifles, advancing in formation towards Longshan Mountain. Yesterday you were a literary lady, today you become a martial general."

Note: In 1922 Sun Yat-Sen made the statement that "A single brush is stronger than three thousand Mauser rifles".After the outbreak of the Second Sino-Japanese War, Ding served as the director of the "Northwest Field Service Corps", and led wartime anti-Japanese theatre performance tours to the front line from Yan'an from September 1937 to July 1938. After that, Ding settled in Yan'an and wrote literary works. At the end of 1939, Ding worked in the Cultural Association of Shaanxi-Gansu-Ningxia Border Region

However, in September 1940, because of her experience in Nanjing, Ding came under suspect for surrendering herself to the Kuomintang. She asked the Communist Party to make a review, during which she did not mention the "note" she wrote. The review passed. On October 4, the "Conclusion of the Central Organization Department's Review of Comrade Ding Ling's Arrest and Ban" stated, "According to the existing materials, there is no concrete proof that Comrade Ding Ling had surrendered himself. Therefore, the legend of surrender cannot be trusted. But Comrade Ding Ling Not taking advantage of the possibility (although there are also concerns) to leave Nanjing early (it should be estimated that living in Nanjing is not good for foreign influence). This kind of disposal is inappropriate. ... Comrade Ding Ling should be considered to be still a loyal party to the revolution. Communist Party". The last sentence was added by Mao Zedong himself. In May 1941, Ding served as the editor-in-chief of the literary column of "Liberation Daily", an organ of the Communist Party Central Committee.

During this time, Ding wrote the following three well known works:

 The short story "When I Was in Xia Village", published in "Chinese Culture" in June 1941, was adapted from a true story. The story is about a woman forced into prostitution by the Japanese who later joins the Chinese Communist Party as a spy. It criticized the treatment of women within the party and challenged the supposed 'equality' between men and women that it failed to uphold. Ding Ling said that the heroine Zhenzhen "entrusted her own feelings" because she was "lonely", "proud" and "tough".
 The short story "In the Hospital", published in the "Gu Yu" magazine on November 15, 1941 and was also adapted from a true story. The short story criticized the hardships of a Yan'an hospital from the perspective of a new nurse. Ding was later criticized for this story for "having the standpoint of a petty-bourgeois intellectual".
 The essay "Thoughts on March 8", published in Communist Party newspaper "Liberation Daily" on March 9, 1942, questioning the party's commitment to change popular attitudes towards women. Here, Ding satirized male double standards concerning women, saying they were ridiculed if they focused on household duties, but also became the target of gossip and rumors if they remained unmarried and worked in the public sphere. She also criticized male cadres use of divorce provisions to rid themselves of unwanted wives. Her article was condemned by Mao Zedong and the party leadership, and she was forced to retract her views and undergo a public self-confession.

The Yan'an Rectification Movement 
In February 1942, the Yan'an Rectification Movement started and intellectuals were attacked. The literary and art circles responded immediately. At that time, Ding Ling was the editor of the literature and art column of "Liberation Daily". This column published a series of defensive articles around March, arguing that there were hierarchical systems and suppression of speech in Yan'an at that time. These included "The March 8th Festival" (March 9), Ai Qing's "Understanding Writers, Respecting Writers" (March 11), Luo Feng's "The Age of Essays" (March 12), Wang Shiwei's "Age" Wild Lily " (March 13, 23), and Xiao Jun's "On the "Love" and "Endurance" of Comrades (April 8). These articles were later criticized, and although Ding Ling resigned had resigned by March 12, she was also implicated.

On April 25, Ding Ling wrote "Memories of Xiao Hong in the Wind and Rain", which was published in June, and which subtly criticized the political climate at Yan'an."What is the most terrifying thing in the world? It is by no means difficult and dangerous, it is by no means floods and beasts, and it is by no means desolation and loneliness. What is hard to endure is the gloom and humiliation; the greatness of man is not the ability to ride the wind and the sky to rise, not only to be able to resist the overthrow, but to open up the situation and indicate the light under the pressure of the haze."On May 2, Mao Zedong criticized Ding Ling at the Yan'an Forum on Literature and Art: "What problems should be solved in literature and art work? For the Communist Party members, it means to stand on the side of the Party, on the side of the Party's nature and the Party's policies... One of the basic viewpoints of Marxism is that existence determines consciousness, which is class struggle. The objective reality of national struggle determines our thoughts and feelings. But some of our comrades have turned this question upside down, saying that everything should start from 'love'." Since then, a large number of critical articles against Ding Ling and others  appeared in the newspapers.

On June 11, under political pressure, Ding Ling criticized fellow writer Wang Shiwei who was purged from the Party. “(Wang Shiwei’s problem) is no longer a question of ideological methods, but a question of motivation, anti-party ideology and Behavior is a political issue." Wang would be subject to a struggle session and imprisoned and later executed five years later.

In February 1942, Ding Ling married Chen Ming, the president of Yan'an Fenghuo Opera Club. Ding Ling was 13 years older than Chen Ming, and the relationship was the source of much discussion.

In 1943, the rectification movement intensified and many more Communist Party members were purged. Ding Ling came under great pressure and was subject to disciplinary review. In 1945, the "Review Team's Preliminary Conclusions on Ding Ling's Historical Issues" stated: "There are materials to prove that there is no suspicion of Ding being dispatched by the Kuomintang. But whether the serious ideological problems during this period were affected by the softening of the Kuomintang after the arrest, Comrade Ding Ling deeply reflected on himself. After the rectification, there has been progress.” Thus she was spared.

After 1942, Ding Ling entered a low period, and it was not until she wrote "Tian Baolin" in 1944, which was praised by Mao Zedong, that she began to actively create again.

Land reform and The Sun Shines Over Sanggan River 
In early October 1945, Ding and other Yan'an writers marched more than 2,000 miles on foot to Zhangjiakou, the then-capital of the Jin-Cha-Ji Border Area. During this time she lived in the office of the "Jin-Cha-Ji Daily" and devoted herself to writing. On March 12, 1946, she became the editor of the bimonthly magazine "Northern Culture", and took up various other literary roles.

In the summer of 1946, land reform came underway in Communist controlled regions of China, and Ding Ling joined the land reform team organized by the Jin-Cha-Ji Central Bureau which traveled around various towns in the region to implement land reform in the region. During the land reform, the Chinese Civil War had broken out and Ding had to retreat back to Zhangjiakou and later to Red Earth Mountain in Fuping County.

This experience was the inspiration for Ding's primary work during these years, the novel The Sun Shines Over Sanggan River, which was completed in 1948. The book was awarded the Stalin prize for Literature in 1951, and is considered one of the best examples of socialist-realist fiction. When recalling the motivation for the creation of this novel, Ding wrote: "Because I have lived with these people and fought together, I love this group of people and this life, and I want to keep them in real life, on paper."

Unlike the fictionalized village depicted in The Sun Shines Over Sanggan River which enjoys its liberation, the village on which Ding based her novel was captured by the Nationalists shortly after Ding's land reform work team left. According to Ding, her beloved peasants "suffer[ed] reprisals from despotic landlords" after the village's capture.

Life in the early People's Republic of China 
After 1949, Ding took up several important cultural and literary posts in the new Chinese government. These posts included editor-in-chief of " Literature and Art Newspaper ", the director of the Central Literature Research Institute, the director of the Literature and Art Department of the CCP Propaganda Bureau, the party secretary and vice chairman of the Chinese Writers' Association , the editor-in-chief of "People's Literature", and the deputy secretary of the party group of the China Federation of Literary and Art Circles.

In 1949 and 1950, Ding criticized the base tastes of much popular literature, but also recognized that revolutionary literature was not yet well-developed. She called for the rejection of "the vulgar and outmoded butterfly literature style," but also emphasized that it was necessary to "do research on the interests of readers" in order to "keep[] the masses in mind." Ding favored worker-peasant-soldier literature and art but recognized that this form was "not yet very mature."

In 1954, Ding was awarded the second prize of the Soviet State Prize for Literature for "The Sun Shines on the Sanggan River", and in 1954, Ding was elected to the PRC's first National People's Congress.

Purge and exile 
In 1955, Ding's former League of Left-Wing Writers colleague Hu Feng, who helped her escape from Nanjing to Shanghai in 1936, underwent a massive purge, with claims that he was leading a "Hu Feng Counter-Revolutionary Clique". Under the political climate, Ding criticized Hu in a critical article "Where Do Enemies Come From", which was published in the People's Daily on May 23, 1955, No. 3. Hu was later sentenced to prison for 14 years and would not be rehabilitated until 1979.

Soon, Ding Ling herself was criticized. In July 1955, Lu Dingyi wrote an article accusing Ding of "liberalism and individualism", and in August, she was designated as the leader member of the "Ding Ling and Chen Qixia Anti-Party Small Group". Ding was expelled from the Communist Party on December 6.

In 1957 the Anti-Rightist Campaign started. Because Ding authorized the publication of Wang Shiwei's "Wild Lily Flower" in Yan'an, she was designated as a rightist, and was disqualified from the National People's Congress in February 1958.

On January 26, 1958, Ding Ling was denounced in a special edition of "Re-Criticism" published by the government "Literature and Art Newspaper". Mao Zedong personally edited the note and criticized the criticized Ding Ling and other writers by name many times, calling to mind the note she wrote while in Nanjing: "What are you to criticize again? Wang Shiwei's "Criticism" Wild Lily, Ding Ling's "Feelings of the March 8th Festival", Xiao Jun's "On the "Love" and "Endurance" of Comrades, Luo Feng's "The Age of Essays", Ai Qing's "Understanding Writers and Respecting Writers" , and several others. The above-mentioned articles were all published in the literary and artistic supplement of the "Liberation Daily" in Yan'an. Ding Ling and Chen Qixia presided over this supplement. Ding Ling's novel "When in the Hospital" was published in 1941 in The Yan'an literary publication "Gu Yu" was renamed "In the Hospital" the following year and republished in Chongqing's "Literary and Art Front". The articles by Wang Shiwei, Ding Ling, and Xiao Jun were used by the Kuomintang spy agency as anti-communist propaganda at that time.... Ding Ling wrote a letter of surrender in Nanjing and betrayed the proletariat and the Communist Party to Chiang Kai-shek. She concealed it and deceived the trust of the party.... The articles of Ding Ling, Wang Shiwei and others helped the Japanese imperialists and the Chiang Kai-shek reactionaries..."In June 1958, Ding Ling and her husband Chen Ming were sent to exile in the Great Northern Wilderness in Mancuria. She spent five years in jail during the Cultural Revolution and was sentenced to do manual labor on a farm for twelve years before being "rehabilitated" in 1978.

Later years
A few years before her death, Ding was allowed to travel to the United States where she was a guest at the University of Iowa's International Writing Program. Ding Ling and her husband Chen Ming visited Canada in 1981 for 10 days, meeting with Canadian writers Margaret Laurence, Adele Wiseman, and Geoff Hancock; and even Canada's first female Lieutenant Governor, Pearl McGonigal for the province of Manitoba. Ding Ling died in Beijing on March 4, 1986.

Ding authored more than three hundred works. After her "rehabilitation" many of her previously banned books such as her novel The Sun Shines Over The Sanggan River were republished and translated into numerous languages. Some of her short works, spanning a fifty-year period, are collected in I Myself Am A Woman: Selected Writings Of Ding Ling.

In her introduction to Miss Sophie's Diary And Other Stories, Ding Ling explains her indebtedness to the writers of other cultures:I can say that if I had not been influenced by Western literature I would probably not have been able to write fiction, or at any rate not the kind of fiction in this collection. It is obvious that my earliest stories followed the path of Western realism... A little later, as the Chinese revolution developed, my fiction changed with the needs of the age and of the Chinese people... Literature ought to join minds together... turning ignorance into mutual understanding. Time, place and institutions cannot separate it from the friends it wins... And in 1957, a time of spiritual suffering for me, I found consolation in reading much Latin American and African literature.

Works

Collections
Zai hei’an zhong [In the Darkness]. 1928.
Zisha riji [Diary of a Suicide]. 1928.
Yige nüren [A Woman]. 1928.
Shujia zhong [During the Summer Holidays]. 1928.
Awei guniang [The Girl Awei]. 1928.
Shui [Water]. 1930.
Yehui [Night Meeting]. 1930.
Zai yiyuan zhong [In the Hospital]. 1941.
Ding Ling wenji [Works of Ding Ling], Hunan Renmin Chubanshe. 6 vols. 1982.
Ding Ling xuanji [Selected Works of Ding Ling], Sichuan Renmin Chubanshe. 3 vols. 1984.

Fiction
Meng Ke. 1927.
Shafei nüshi riji. February 1928, Xiaoshuo yuebao (short story magazine); as Miss Sophia's Diary, translated by Gary Bjorge, 1981.
Weihu. 1930.
Muqin. 1930; as Mother, translated by Tani Barlow, 1989.
1930 Chun Shanghai. 1930; as Shanghai, Spring, 1930, translated by Tani Barlow, 1989.
Zai yiyuan zhong. 1941; as In the Hospital, translated by Gary Bjorge, 1981.
Wo zai Xia cun de shihou. 1941; as When I Was in Xia Village, translated by Gary Bjorge, 1981.
Taiyang zhao zai Sanggan he shang. Guanghua shudian. September 1948; as The Sun Shines Over Sanggan River, translated by Gladys Yang and Yang Xianyi, Panda Books, 1984.
Du Wanxiang. 1978; as Du Wanxiang, translated by Tani Barlow, 1989.

Further reading
 Chinese Writers on Writing featuring Ding Ling. Ed. Arthur Sze. (Trinity University Press, 2010).
Alber, Charles J. Embracing the Lie: Ding Ling and the Politics of Literature in the PRC. Westport, CT: Praeger, 2004. 1 copy.
Barlow, Tani, "Gender and Identity in Ding Ling's 'Mother.'" Modern Chinese Literature 2, 2 (1986): 123–42.
Barlow, Tani, The Question of Women in Chinese Feminism. Durham, Duke University Press, 2004. 1 copy. (contains material on Ding Ling).
Bjorge, Gary J. "'Sophia's Diary': An Introduction." Tamkang Review 5, 1 (1974): 97–110.
Chang, Jun-mei. Ting Ling, Her Life and Her Work. Taipei: Institute of International Relations, 1978.
Dien, Dora Shu-fang. "Ding Ling and 'Miss Sophie's Diary': A Psychobiographical Study of Adolescent Identity Formation." Making Meaning of Narratives: The Narrative Study of Lives 6 Thousand Oaks, Calif.: Sage Publications, 221–237.
Ding Ling and Her Mother: A Cultural Psychological Study. Huntington, NY: Nova Science, 2001.
Feng, Jin. "The 'Bold Modern Girl': Ding Ling's Early Fiction." In *Feng, The New Woman in Early Twentieth-Century Chinese Fiction. West Lafayette, IN: Purdue University Press, 2001, 149–70.
"The Revolutionary Age: Ding Ling's Fiction of the Early 1930s." In Feng, The New Woman in Early Twentieth-Century Chinese Fiction. West Lafayette, IN: Purdue University Press, 2001, 171–88.
"Ding Ling in Yan'an: A New Woman within the Part Structure?" In Feng, The New Woman in Early Twentieth-Century Chinese Fiction. West Lafayette, IN: Purdue University Press, 2001, 189–96
Feuerwerker, Yi-tsi Mei. Ding Ling's Fiction: Ideology and Narrative in Modern Chinese Literature. Cambridge: Harvard UP, 1982.
"The Changing Relationship between Literature and Life: Aspects of the Writer's Role in Ding Ling [Ting Ling]." In Merle Goldman, ed. Modern Chinese Literature in the May Fourth Era. Cambridge: Harvard University Press, 1977, 281–307.
"Ting Ling's 'When I was in Sha Chuan (Cloud Village)'." Signs, Journal of Women in Culture and Society 2, 1 (1976): 255–79.
"The Uses of Literature: Ding Ling in Yan'an." In W. Kubin and R. Wagner, eds., Essays in Contemporary Chinese LIterature and Literary Criticism. Bochum: Brockmeyer, 1981.
Huang, Xincun. “Politics, Gender and Literary Writings: A Study of Ding Ling in the Early 1940s.” Journal of Asian Culture 14 (1990): 33–54.
Kubin, Wolfgang. "Sexuality and Literature in the People's Republic of China, Problems of the Chinese woman before and after 1949 as seen in Ding Ling's 'Diary of Sophia' (1928) and Xi Rong's story 'An Unexceptional Post' (1962)." In Wolfgang Kubin and Rudolf G. Wagner, eds., Essays in Modern Chinese Literature and Literary Criticism. Bochum: Brockmeyer, 1982, 168–91.
Lai, Amy Tak-yee. "Liberation, Confusion, Imprisonment: The Female Self in Ding Ling's 'Diary of Miss Sophie' and Zhang Jie's 'Love Must Not Be Forgotten.'" Comparative Literature and Culture 3 (Sept. 1998): 88–103.
Tang, Xiaobing. "Shanghai Spring 1930: Engendering the Revolutionary Body." In Chinese Modernism: The Heroic and the Quotidian. Durham: Duke UP, 2000, 97–130.
Wang, Shunzhu. "The Double-Voiced Feminine Discouses in Ding Ling's 'Miss Sophie's Diary' and Zora Neale Hurston's Their Eyes Were Watching God." Tamkang Review 27, 1 (1997): 133–158.
Zhang, Jingyuan. "Feminism and Revolution: The Work and Life of Ding Ling." In Joshua Mostow, ed, and Kirk A. Denton, China section, ed., Columbia Companion to Modern East Asian Literatures. NY: Columbia UP, 2003, 395–400.
Zhou Liangpei. Ding Ling zhuan (Biography of Ding Ling). Beijing: Beijing shiyue wenyi, 1993.

See also

 Thoughts on March 8
When I was in Xia Village
Sanggan River

References

Footnotes

Ebrey, Patricia. Cambridge Illustrated History of China. Cambridge University Press, June 13, 1996. 
Solomon, Barbara H., "Other Voices, Other Vistas", A Mentor Book, March 1992

External links 
 Ding Ling. A Portrait by Kong Kai Ming at Hong Kong Baptist University Library

1904 births
1986 deaths
20th-century Chinese women writers
Pseudonymous women writers
People's Republic of China novelists
Republic of China novelists
People from Changde
Short story writers from Hunan
International Writing Program alumni
20th-century Chinese short story writers
Chinese women short story writers
Victims of the Anti-Rightist Campaign
Republic of China short story writers
20th-century pseudonymous writers
Burials at Babaoshan Revolutionary Cemetery